The Texas Colored League was a minor league Negro baseball league organized in 1919 and lasted until 1926. The league did not play a schedule in 1922.

The league was revived three years later in 1929 as the Texas–Oklahoma–Louisiana League and renamed the Texas–Louisiana Negro League for the 1930 and 1931 seasons.

Teams

1919–26 

Teams listed alphabetically by city for the 1919–21 and 1923–26 seasons.  Some teams may be the same franchise with a different name or location.

 Austin (1919–20)
 Austin Black Senators (1923–26)
 Beaumont (1919)
 Beaumont Black Oilers (1920–21, 1924)
 Beaumont Black Exporters (1923)
 Dallas Black Marines (1919, 1921)
 Dallas Black Giants (1920, 1923–26)
 Fort Worth (1919)
 Fort Worth Black Panthers (1920–21, 1923–24)
 Fort Worth Wonders (1923)
 Dallas-Fort Worth Black Wonders (1925)
 Fort Worth Monarchs (1926)
 Galveston (1919)
 Galveston Black Pirates (1920)
 Galveston Black Sand Crabs (1921)
 Houston (1919)
 Houston Black Buffaloes (1920–21, 1924–26)
 (a.k.a. Black Buffalos 1924–26)

 Monroe Southern Giants (1923)
 New Orleans Crescent Stars (1923)
 New Orleans (1925)
 Oklahoma City Black Indians (1925)
 San Antonio Black Aces (1919–20)
 San Antonio Black Bronchos (1923, 1925)
 San Antonio Porters (1924)
 San Antonio (1926)
 Shreveport Giants (1923)
 Shreveport Black Sports (1926)
 Tulsa (OK) (1920)
 Tulsa Black Oilers (1923)
 Waco (1919)
 Waco Black Navigators (1920)
 Wichita Falls Black Spudders (1921)
 Wichita Falls (1926)

1929–31 

 Dallas Black Giants (1929–31)
 Fort Worth Black Panthers (1929)
 Houston Black Buffaloes (1929–31) (a.k.a. Black Buffalos 1929)
 Oklahoma City Black Indians (1929)
 San Antonio Black Indians (1929–31)
 Shreveport Black Sports (1929, 1931)
 Tulsa Black Oilers (1929)
 Wichita Falls (1929)
 New Orleans Black Pelicans (1930–31)
 Port Arthur (1930)
 Waco (1930)
 Monroe Monarchs (1931)
 Galveston Black Buccaneers (1931)
 Fort Worth Black Cats (1931)

Champions 

 1919 San Antonio Black Aces
 1920 Austin
 1921 Houston Black Buffaloes
 1923 Austin Black Senators
 1924 Austin Black Senators
 1925 Austin Black Senators
 1926 Austin Black Senators
 1929 no information available
 1930 last half of season not reported; possibly Houston Black Buffaloes
 1931 Monroe Monarchs

References

External links 

Center for Negro League Research

Negro baseball leagues
Defunct baseball leagues in the United States
Baseball leagues in Louisiana
Baseball leagues in Oklahoma
Baseball leagues in Texas
Sports leagues established in 1919
Defunct minor baseball leagues in the United States
African-American history of Texas
African-American history of Oklahoma
African-American history of Louisiana